Luigi "Gigi" Peronace (29 November 1925 – 29 December 1980) was a Calabrian football agent doing business predominantly between English and Italian clubs. He has been described as the "first real agent in England".

Luigi Peronace was born in Soverato, Calabria, Italy was born on 29 November 1925. His initial involvement in football came as a playing goalkeeper. Peronace spoke English, and when the British troops came to Calabria during the Second World War he organised football games with them. After the war he went to Turin to study engineering, but there he also became interpreter to Juventus's Scottish manager, William Chalmers, and then to his managerial successor, Jesse Carver. When Carver was sacked, Peronace was no longer needed and let go. He later reunited with Carver when he took the post of business manager at Torino. In 1954, he was unexpectedly put in charge of transfers at Lazio, the team which he supported.

In 1957, Leyton Orient manager Alec Stock was interested in moving to Italy. He was put in contact with Peronace, and they discussed the possibility of a move in Green Park. Peronace convinced A.S. Roma that Stock was the manager they wanted and the move was completed. That year Peronace also negotiated the transfer of John Charles from Leeds United to Juventus for £65,000 and a £10,000 signing-on fee. In 1961, he negotiated the transfer of Jimmy Greaves from Chelsea to A.C. Milan,
and the transfers of two Scottish players to Torino – Joe Baker from Hibernian and Denis Law from Manchester City. He also aided friend Matt Busby in transferring Law back to England in 1962, this time to Manchester United.

He helped organise the Anglo-Italian Cup in the 70s and 80s, and following his death in 1981, the 1982–86 instalments of the tournament were named the Gigi Peronace Memorial. Peronace moved to London, and bought a home in Twickenham. Under Enzo Bearzot, he became general manager for the Italy national football team at the 1978 FIFA World Cup. He did the same job at the 1980 UEFA European Football Championship, and later that year he was influential in the transfer of Liam Brady from Arsenal to Juventus. Gigi suffered a fatal heart attack in December 1980. He was in Montevideo preparing with the Italian team for the 1980 Mundialito and died in Bearzot's arms in the team hotel on 29 December 1980. He left behind a wife and five children. Peronace is the first Italian football agent and football manager, with great success in the U.K., before any other Italian, such as Fabio Capello, Carlo Ancelotti or Antonio Conte.

References

1925 births
1980 deaths
People from the Province of Catanzaro
Italian sports agents
Association football agents
Football people in Italy